Chudomir (March 25, 1890 – December 26, 1967), born Dimitar Hristov Chorbadjisky, was a Bulgarian writer and painter.

He is famous for his short stories, such as "I'm not One of Them" ("Не съм от тях") and "Locals" ("Нашенци"), satirizing the human weaknesses and political vices of his time.

Biography
He was born in village Turia (Bulgarian Kingdom) on March 25, 1890 and died in Sofia (People's Republic of Bulgaria) in 1967. He was one of the five children in the family of Maria Doncheva and Hristo Chorbadjiiski. Until the age of 16, he studied in a local school. In 1913 he graduated from the National-painter-industrial college in Sofia. He took part in the Balkan wars and World War I. In 1921 he married Mary Nonova. He was a school teacher for 13 years (1920–1933) in Kazanlak. From 1929–1930 Chudomir specialized drawing in Paris. Until his death he was the president of 'Iskra' library and director of the Ethnographic museum in Kazanlak.

Honour
Chudomir Cove in Graham Land, Antarctica is named after Chudomir.

Gallery

Bulgarian writers
1890 births
1967 deaths
20th-century Bulgarian people
Bulgarian military personnel of the Balkan Wars
Bulgarian military personnel of World War I
Members of the National Assembly (Bulgaria)
People from Kazanlak
20th-century Bulgarian painters
20th-century male artists
1967 suicides
Male painters